Guns is a Canadian television miniseries that aired on CBC Television in 2008. Directed by Sudz Sutherland and written by Sutherland and Jennifer Holness, the miniseries explores the issue of gun violence in Canada.

The cast includes Colm Feore, Elisha Cuthbert, Stephen McHattie, K. C. Collins, Shawn Doyle and Lyriq Bent.

External links
 
 
 

2008 Canadian television series debuts
CBC Television original films
Films directed by Sudz Sutherland
2000s Black Canadian television series
2000s Canadian television miniseries
Canadian drama television films